The men's heavyweight event was part of the boxing programme at the 1932 Summer Olympics. The weight class was the heaviest contested, and allowed boxers over 175 pounds (79.4 kilograms). The competition was held from Wednesday, August 10, 1932 to Saturday, August 13, 1932. Six boxers from six nations competed.

Medalists

Results

References

External links
Official Olympic Report
 

Heavyweight